Dimitrios Loundras (6 September 1885 in Athens – 15 February 1970) was a Greek gymnast and naval officer who competed at the 1896 Summer Olympics in Athens. He was the last surviving participant of these Games.

Loundras competed in the team parallel bars event. In that competition, Loundras was a member of the Ethnikos Gymnastikos Syllogos team that placed third of the three teams in the event, giving him a bronze medal. At 10 years 218 days he remains the youngest medalist and competitor in Olympic history, if one discounts an unknown competitor, who competed as coxswain for the Dutch coxed pair rowing team in the 1900 Olympics, (which for this reason is considered a mixed team), believed to be a French boy from 7 to 10 years old, but who according to Dutch expert Tony Bijkerk he was more likely nearer 12 years of age.

Loundras later became an officer in the Royal Hellenic Navy, graduating from the Hellenic Navy Academy as an ensign in 1905. He served in various commands as well as a naval attache, and fought in World War I, before retiring with the rank of rear admiral in 1935. On the outbreak of the Greco-Italian War in 1940, he was recalled to active service and appointed head of the Aegean Naval Command. He finally retired in 1945 as a vice admiral. From 1924 on he was a member of the Hellenic Olympic Committee. After World War II he played a leading role in the establishment of the Hellenic Shooting Federation, and became its first president. In 1936 he also served briefly as prefect of Lesbos Prefecture.

References

External links

1885 births
1970 deaths
Greek male artistic gymnasts
Gymnasts at the 1896 Summer Olympics
19th-century sportsmen
Olympic bronze medalists for Greece
Olympic gymnasts of Greece
Olympic medalists in gymnastics
Medalists at the 1896 Summer Olympics
Greek military personnel of World War I
Royal Hellenic Navy admirals of World War II
Greek naval attachés
Gymnasts from Athens
Place of death missing